Ernest Augustus Charles Brudenell-Bruce, 3rd Marquess of Ailesbury PC (8 January 1811 – 18 October 1886), styled Lord Ernest Bruce from 1821 until 1878, was a British courtier and politician. He served as Vice-Chamberlain of the Household between 1841 and 1846 and again between 1852 and 1858. An MP for 46 years, he succeeded his elder brother in the marquessate in 1878.

Background and education
Brudenell-Bruce was born at Warren's Hotel, St James's Square, London, the second son of Charles Brudenell-Bruce, 1st Marquess of Ailesbury, by his wife the Honourable Henrietta Maria Hill, daughter of Noel Hill, 1st Baron Berwick. George Brudenell-Bruce, 2nd Marquess of Ailesbury was his elder brother and Lord Charles Bruce his younger half-brother. He was educated at Eton College and Trinity College, Cambridge.

Political career
Brudenell-Bruce was returned to Parliament for Marlborough in 1832. He was a Lord of the Bedchamber to William IV from 1834 to 1835. In 1841 he was sworn of the Privy Council and appointed Vice-Chamberlain of the Household under Sir Robert Peel, a post he held until the government fell in 1846. He returned to the same office in December 1852 in Lord Aberdeen's coalition government. He continued in the post also when Lord Palmerston became prime minister in 1855, finally resigning in 1858. He remained MP for Marlborough until 1878, when he succeeded his elder brother in the marquessate and entered the House of Lords. In 1884 he was made Lord-Lieutenant of Berkshire, a post he held until his death two years later.

Family 
Lord Ailesbury married the Honourable Louisa Elizabeth Horsley-Beresford, daughter of John Horsley-Beresford, 2nd Baron Decies, on 25 November 1834. They had seven children:

 Lady Louisa Caroline Brudenell-Bruce (d. December 1894), married Sir Henry Meux, 2nd Baronet.
 Lady Ernestine Mary Brudenell-Bruce (d.27 December 1936), married William Hare, 3rd Earl of Listowel.
 Lieutenant George John Brudenell-Bruce (15 May 1839 – 28 May 1868), married Lady Evelyn Mary Craven, daughter of William Craven, 2nd Earl of Craven and had issue George Brudenell-Bruce, 4th Marquess of Ailesbury.
 James Ernest Brudenell-Bruce (30 June 1840 – 21 June 1876), no issue.
 Henry Augustus Brudenell-Bruce, 5th Marquess of Ailesbury (11 April 1842 – 10 March 1911).
 Commodore Lord Robert Thomas Brudenell-Bruce (25 January 1845 – 15 February 1912), married Emma Leigh and had issue.
 Major Lord Charles Frederick Brudenell-Bruce (4 March 1849 – 31 May 1936), married Margaret Renshaw, no issue.

Lord Ailesbury died at Tottenham House, Savernake, Wiltshire, in October 1886, aged 75, and was buried at Great Bedwyn, Wiltshire. His grandson George succeeded to the marquessate. The Marchioness of Ailesbury died in October 1891, aged 77, and was also buried at Great Bedwyn.

References

External links 

Ailesbury, Ernest Brudenell-Bruce, 3rd Marquess of
Ailesbury, Ernest Brudenell-Bruce, 3rd Marquess of
Brudenell-Bruce, Ernest, Lord
Aliesbury, Ernst Brudenell-Bruce, 3rd Marquess of
Ailesbury, Ernest Brudenell-Bruce, 3rd Marquess of
Ailesbury, Ernest Brudenell-Bruce, 3rd Marquess of
Brudenell-Bruce, Ernest, Lord
Brudenell-Bruce, Ernest, Lord
Brudenell-Bruce, Ernest, Lord
Brudenell-Bruce, Ernest, Lord
Brudenell-Bruce, Ernest, Lord
Brudenell-Bruce, Ernest, Lord
Brudenell-Bruce, Ernest, Lord
Brudenell-Bruce, Ernest, Lord
Brudenell-Bruce, Ernest, Lord
Brudenell-Bruce, Ernest, Lord
Brudenell-Bruce, Ernest, Lord
Ailesbury, M3
Ernest
Earls of Cardigan
3
People educated at Eton College